Chen Huanyou (born 1934) is a retired Chinese politician who served as Governor and Communist Party Secretary of Jiangsu Province.

Chen was born in Nantong, Jiangsu. In March 1950, he entered PLA's Northeast University of Military and Politics and served in the army. In 1952, he enrolled at the industrial economics department of Renmin University of China, and later at engineering economics department at Harbin Institute of Technology.

He was elected governor of Jiangsu in April 1989. He became the secretary of CPC Jiangsu committee in September 1993.

He was a member of CPC's 14th and 15th Central Committees. 

His major works include "Practices and Thoughts on Jiangsu's Modern Construction", "Introduction to Jiangsu by Chen Huanyou" and "Ten-year Exploration in Jiangsu's Modern Construction".

References
Chen Huanyou's profile at xinhuanet.com

1934 births
Living people
Political office-holders in Jiangsu
Politicians from Nantong
Chinese Communist Party politicians from Jiangsu
People's Republic of China politicians from Jiangsu
Renmin University of China alumni
Harbin Institute of Technology alumni